Ljudevit Farkaš Vukotinović (13 January 1813 – 17 March 1893) was a Croatian politician, writer and naturalist.

He was born in Zagreb. He studied philosophy in Szombathely, and law in Zagreb and Bratislava, where he graduated. In 1836, he was a trainee at the Tabula Banalis and, after passing the bar exam in 1836, was appointed as a sub-notary of Križevci County and, in 1840, as the Grand Judge in Moslavina Kotar. As a representative of the Croatian Parliament, where he had served since 1847, he was responsible, along with Ivan Kukuljević Sakcinski, for the declaration of Croatian as the official language in 1847.

During the Revolutions of 1848 in the Austrian Empire, he served as the supreme commander of the armies in Križevci County, securing the defense on the river of Drava and in Međimurje, and publishing reports from the front lines in Slavenski jug. In 1849–1854, he served as the president of the Regional Court in Križevci until his forced retirement due to his opposition to the introduction of German as the official language. After the fall of Bach's absolutism, he served in Ban's Conference in 1860 and as the Grand Župan of Križevci County in 1861–1867. Although, he was appointed as a representative in the Croatian Parliament as a member of the People's Party in 1871, he soon turned Unionist, and has not entered the civil service ever since.

As a political writer, Vukotinović made appearance with Ilirizam i kroatizam ("Illyrism and Croatim", 1842), an essay in which he debated on the cultural and linguistic unity of South Slavs based on their ethnic unity, and the struggle for an independent position of Croatia within the Kingdom of Hungary and the Habsburg monarchy. In the dissertation Regni Slavoniae erga Hungarium legalis correlatio ("The legal relationship between the Kingdom of Slavonia to Hungary", 1845), he opposed the Hungarian encroachments of three Slavonian counties (Virovitica, Syrmia and Požega counties), stressing the state unity of Croatia, Slavonia and Dalmatia. During the Revolutions of 1848, he published a brochure, Nekoja glavna pitanja našeg vremena ("Some major issues of our time"), in which he pointed out the contemporary political issues in Croatia, while in the brochure Godina 1850. u Hrvatskoj ("The year 1850 in Croatia", 1851) he opposed the centralisation and Germanisation.

Vukotinović's literary work began in Danica ilirska, where he published in 1835 the first Illyrian patriotic poem Pesma Horvatov vu Glogovi leto 1813, known by verse Nek se hrusti šaka mala. He published collections Pjesme i pripovjetke ("Poems and short stories", 1838), Ruže i trnje ("Roses and thorns", 1842), Pesme ("Poems", 1847) and Trnule (1867), and a collection of historical short stories, Pošasnost ugarsko-hrvatska (1844).

In 1842, together with Stanko Vraz and Dragutin Rakovac, he founded the literary magazine Kolo and, in 1859–1861, established and edited the almanac Leptir. With Dragutin Rakovac, he edited in 1842 the first Croatian anthology of patriotic poetry Pesmarica. Sbirka 1. Pesmice domorodne. He also authored theatre plays (Golub, 1832).

As a naturalist, Vukotinović was engaged in botany, exploring the Croatian flora and co-authoring with Josip Schlosser a number of important floristic works: Syllabus florae Croaticae ("An overview of the Croatian flora", 1843), Bilinar (1873) and the seminal work Flora Croatica ("Croatian flora", 1869). His herbarium is now a part of the collection Herbarium Croaticum in the Department of Botany, Faculty of Science in Zagreb. He also studied petrography, mineralogy and geology, and was one of the founders of the National Museum in Zagreb. He served as a secretary of the Economic Society (1854) and edited Gospodarski list (1855–1857). In 1867, he was appointed as a full member of the Yugoslav Academy of Sciences and Arts.

He died on 17 March 1893 in Zagreb and was buried at Mirogoj Cemetery.

References

1813 births
1893 deaths
19th-century Croatian scientists
19th-century Croatian writers
Austrian Empire politicians
Austro-Hungarian writers
Botanists from the Austro-Hungarian Empire
Burials at Mirogoj Cemetery
Croatian botanists
Croatian male writers
Croatian politicians
People of the Illyrian movement
Representatives in the Croatian Parliament (1848–1918)
Scientists from Zagreb
Writers from the Austrian Empire
Writers from Zagreb